Ohio University Airport or Gordon K. Bush Airport , also known as Snyder Field, is a public-use airport located on State Route 32/U.S. 50 in the village of Albany, about ten miles (16 km) southwest of the city of Athens, in Athens County, Ohio, United States.

The airport is owned by Ohio University in Athens, not to be confused with
Ohio State University in Columbus, which owns the Ohio State University Airport (IATA/FAA: OSU).

Although most U.S. airports use the same three-letter location identifier for the FAA and IATA, Ohio University Airport is assigned UNI by the FAA and ATO by the IATA (which assigned UNI to the airport on Union Island in Saint Vincent and the Grenadines).

History
Athens County's first airport was located just a few miles east of Athens on U.S. 50.  The Rowland Family used to own that airport until Ohio University purchased it in 1943.  The airport at the time was used for civilian aviation and the university's flying program.  In the 1960s, the Athens Bypass was in planning stages and would have gone through the airport's land.  With this, the university decided to look for a new location.

The university finally chose a location just west of Albany and the airport was constructed in the early 1970s and opened around 1972.  The airport boasted a  runway and a couple of hangars.  The airport was renamed for university trustee and aviation supporter, Gordon K. Bush.  In order to bring economic expansion to Athens County, major construction began on the airport in 2002 with the construction of the C. David Snyder Terminal and the extension of the runway to 5600 feet.

Facilities and aircraft
(1,707 x 30 m).

The airport offers fuel services, a pilot snooze room, flight training, and mechanics on site.

For the 12-month period ending December 31, 2005, the airport had 51,600 aircraft operations, an average of 141 per day: 99% general aviation, <1% air taxi and <1% military. There are 48 aircraft based at this airport: 88% single-engine, 10% multi-engine and 2% jet.

Aviation Program
The aviation program started training pilots in 1939. Today, the students train in state-of-the-art glass-paneled aircraft. Piper Warrior III aircraft were purchased in the summer of 2004 with glass panels for primary training as well as instrument and flight instructor courses. The chair of the program is Deak Arch and the chief flight instructor is Ron Faliszek, assistant chief instructors are Derek McVicar and Jeff Barrett  The training aircraft consist of 7 Piper Warrior IIIs, 2 Piper Arrow IIIs, 3 Cessna 152s, 3 Cessna 172s and 2 Beachcraft Barons. The students earn private pilot through multi-engine instructor certificates in these airplanes along with associate degrees in Aviation Technology or Bachelor of Science degrees in Aviation Science.
Ohio University's Avionics Engineering Center is the only facility of its kind in the United States. The Avionics Center specializes in the research, development, and evaluation of electronic navigation and communication. The avionics center utilizes a Douglas DC-3 and an Aero L-29 Delfín among other piston aircraft.

Construction
In 2002, the airport expanded its runway from 4,200 feet to 5,600 feet to accommodate larger aircraft. At this time, the decision was made to also start work on the C. David Snyder Terminal. In 2009, a $3.15 million grant was awarded to the airport from the American Recovery and Reinvestment Act to improve the safety of the airport by filling in valleys and removing hills that surrounded the airport. Currently the airport is looking to rehabilitate the runway, a project that's estimated to cost around $3–4 million.

Maintenance
Ohio University's mechanics are A&P and IA certified and specialize in Cessna, Beechcraft, Piper, Mooney, and Bellanca airframes. They also specialize in Lycoming and Continental engines. “The FAA has declared Ohio University Airport a certified repair station. “That was a big step for us to meet all of their requirements,” -Ken Carly .

References

References and external links
Ohio University Department of Aviation
Air Bobcat Shuttle Services

Airports in Ohio
Buildings and structures of Ohio University
Buildings and structures in Athens County, Ohio
Transportation in Athens County, Ohio
University and college airports